US Hollerich Bonnevoie is a defunct football team which was merged with Jeunesse Sportive Verlorenkost to create Union Sportive Luxembourg in 1925. Their main claim to fame is winning the Luxembourg championship in 1916/17 with a 100% record – 10 games, 10 wins, 0 draws and 0 losses.

Honours
National Division
Winners (5): 1911–12, 1913–14, 1914–15, 1915–16, 1916–17
Runners-up (2): 1909–10, 1917–18

References

Defunct football clubs in Luxembourg
Football clubs in Luxembourg City
1925 disestablishments in Luxembourg